Aivaras Laurišas (born 15 April 1977) is a Lithuanian football forward, who plays for FK Tauras Tauragė. He obtained three caps for the Lithuania national football team, scoring no goals. Laurišas also played as a professional in Russia and Latvia during his career.

Honours
National Team
 Baltic Cup
 2005

References

1977 births
Living people
Lithuanian footballers
Lithuania international footballers
Association football forwards
Lithuanian expatriate footballers
Expatriate footballers in Russia
Expatriate footballers in Latvia
FBK Kaunas footballers
FK Atlantas players
Daugava Rīga players
Dinaburg FC players
FC Fakel Voronezh players
FC Vilnius players
Lithuanian expatriate sportspeople in Latvia